Neil Turner Weir is a small weir located on the northern side of the town of Mitchell, in Queensland, Australia. The weir holds back the waters of the Maranoa River. A campsite exists, with public toilets, picnic tables and barbeque facilities. A little further west, five kilometres from Mitchell, on the banks of the river held back by the weir, is a fishing spot known as Fisherman's Rest.

The weir was built in 1984 and is made of concrete and filled with sand. The capacity of the Neil Turner Weir is 2,000 ML.

The weir supplies water to the town of Mitchell, is used for irrigation and regulates streamflow.

See also

List of dams and reservoirs in Australia

References

South West Queensland
Reservoirs in Queensland
Dams in Queensland